"Plastic People" is the first track of the Mothers of Invention album Absolutely Free. It also was featured on the You Can't Do That On Stage Anymore (Volume 1) compilation as Track 1 on disc 2, along with a "Louie, Louie/Plastic People"-like version titled "Ruthie-Ruthie" as Track 10 on disc 1. It was also featured on the 1998 Mystery Disc release.

The title was the inspiration for the name of the Czech band Plastic People of the Universe.  The tune is loosely based on Richard Berry's 1957 classic "Louie Louie".  The song is a manifesto against conformity and materialistic culture, with Frank Zappa finally asking, "Go home/and check yourself/you think we're singing 'bout someone else?"

It is sampled throughout the GZA single "Cold World" from the Liquid Swords album.

References

Experimental rock songs
Frank Zappa songs
1967 songs
Songs written by Frank Zappa